The 2025 Virginia gubernatorial election will be held on November 4, 2025. Incumbent Republican Governor Glenn Youngkin will be ineligible to run for re-election, as the Constitution of Virginia prohibits the state's governors from serving consecutive terms.

Republican primary

Candidates

Potential

 Jason Miyares, Virginia Attorney General
 Winsome Sears, Lieutenant Governor of Virginia

Democratic primary

Candidates

Publicly expressed interest
 Eileen Filler-Corn, state delegate and former Speaker of the Virginia House of Delegates

Potential

 Elaine Luria, former U.S. Representative for Virginia's 2nd congressional district
 Jennifer McClellan, U.S. Representative for Virginia's 4th congressional district and candidate for governor in 2021
 David A. Reid, state delegate
 Abigail Spanberger, U.S. Representative for Virginia's 7th congressional district
 Levar Stoney, mayor of Richmond

Independents

Publicly expressed interest
Denver Riggleman, former Republican U.S. Representative for

References

Virginia gubernatorial elections
Virginia
Gubernatorial